Saat Bhai Champa or Sat Bhai Chompa is a popular folk tale in the Bengal region in the eastern part of the Indian subcontinent. The story was first officially published by Dakshinaranjan Mitra Majumder in the book Thakurmar Jhuli in 1907. The introduction to Thakurmar Jhuli was written by Nobel-Laureate, Rabindranath Tagore. A more detailed version of the story was published by Bishnu Dey under the name "Sat Bhai Champa" in 1944.

Plot
Once upon a time, there lived a king. The king was not able to produce any heir to the throne through his seven wives. The king was depressed and spent large amount of time by himself in the forest. A priest in the forest saw the king's misery and gave him mangoes of bearing. The priest instructed the king to feed the fruits to his wives and then they would conceive children. The king gave his three wives the fruits as instructed by the priest. Two elder queens did not produce any children, as they ate it with disbelief. However, the younger queen gave birth to octuplets: seven boys and one girl, when the king was on a voyage. The elder queens became jealous and buried the babies in the garden before the younger queen gained consciousness from pregnancy. The babies magically blossom into seven champak flowers and a trumpet flower. The last baby, the girl, was born some time after first seven babies in a time when the elder queens left the room with seven babies and this enabled the maid to hide the baby from the elder queens and named the child Parul. Elder queens, then, placed seven puppies on the younger queen's bedside and claimed the queen gave birth to seven puppies. Parul grew up in the forest. After learning her origin from her maid, she helped to revive her brothers into princes.

Variants
In a Bengali variant of the story, published by author Geeta Majumdar with the title The Story of The Seven Brothers and a Sister, a nameless rajah has seven wives, the oldest named Premlata and the youngest Sulata. After a long time of praying to God for a child, the youngest queen, Sulata, becomes pregnant. The other six queens become jealous and enraged at the youngest's luck and conspire against her. When the time of labor is upon Sulata, her eight children - seven boys and a girl - are taken from her and thrown in a hole in the garden, and animals are put in their place. The king sees the animals in the cradle and banish Sulata. Some time later, the king's gardener finds a champa tree in the garden with beautiful flowers. He tries to pluck some to give the king, but the flowers move about the branch. The gardener summons the king to witness the strange occurrence. When the king himself tries to get one of the eight flowers on the branch, the flowers move out of reach and a voice tells him to summon the eldest queen. She comes and notices the champa tree sprouted where she and the other queens buried the children. She fails to get any flower. This happens to the other five queens, until the voice tells them to summon Sulata. The disgraced queen, now wearing tatters and looking emaciated, is brought to the champa tree. When she tries to get the flowers, her seven sons come out of the champa buds and her daughter from the parul bud. The king learns of the truth and condemns Premlata and the other queens to be buried alive in a pit filled with thorns and brambles.

In a West Bengali tale published by author Pranab Chandra Roy Choudhury with the title Seven Champa Brothers and Sister Parul, a king has seven queens, the first six arrogant, but the youngest demure and loved best by the king. One day, the seventh queen is pregnant, which fuels the bitter jealousy of the co-queens. The king gives her a bell at the end of a cord to ring if she needs something, but the seventh queen rings it too many times, which annoys the king. Finally, the she gives birth to eight children, seven boys and a girl, who are taken by the co-queens and buried under a dung heap, and replaced by puppies and a kitten. The king, seeing the little animals, banishes the seventh queen to the menial position of cleaning the cowshed. Back to the children, eight trees sprout: seven Champak or Champa flower trees, and one Parul flower. Some time later, the king's gardener tries to pluck the flowers, but the trees begin to speak and call for the co-queens to come. They also cannot get the flowers. The king himself comes and also cannot takes the flowers. Lastly, the disgraced queen comes and plucks the flowers; her children come back to life.

Another variant of the story has it that seven babies turned into seven puppies.

Translations
The tale was translated by Francis Bradley Bradley-Birt into English as The Seven Brothers who were turned into Champa Trees and published in 1920 in the book Bengal Fairy Tales.

The tale was also translated into French as Les Sept Fleurs de Champaka et la Fleur de Paroul ("The Seven Champaka Flowers and the Parul Flower"), and published in 1923.

Analysis
In their joint work, researcher Noriko Mayeda and Indologist W. Norman Brown listed Bradley-Birt's translation as belonging to tale type ATU 707, "The Three Golden Children", of the international Aarne-Thompson-Uther Index, under a form that appears in locally India: the children of a slandered queen are stolen and killed, but reincarnate into flowers.

Arts

Sat-Bhai Champa painting by Gaganendranath Tagore is considered a masterpiece in contemporary Indian arts. The painting is currently located at Academy of Fine Arts of Calcutta.

Adaptations
Several Bengali film have been made based on the Saat Bhai Champa story, including:
Sat Bhai Chompa (1968 film) - The movie was made in East Pakistan, what is now Bangladesh. The director of the movie is Dilip Shome and main casts are Kabori and Khan Ataur Rehman. The movie is ranked by British Film Institute as one of the top ten Bangladeshi film of all time.
Saat Bhai Champa (1978 film) - The movie was made in West Bengal, India. The movie was directed by Chitrasarathi and music of the film was composed by Raghunath Das. The actors starring are Biswajeet, Sandhya Roy, Mrinal Mukherjee, Gita Karmakar, Biswanath Chattopadhyay and Chhanda Chattopadhyay

Saat Bhai Champa (2017–19 TV series) is an Indian fantasy drama television series that aired on Zee Bangla.

Song 
 Bol Na Re Bol Na Song – Saat Bhai Champa Serial – Zee Bangla

See also
 The Boy with the Moon on his Forehead
 Champa Si Ton

References

External links
 English translation of the tale at Wikisource.

Asian fairy tales
Indian fairy tales
Bengali-language literature